EAMS may refer to:
 Early Access to Medicines Scheme, a form of expanded access to unapproved drugs in the United Kingdom
Euro Area Member States, members of the Eurozone
Empire Air Mail Scheme